The Schilling test was a medical investigation used for patients with vitamin B (cobalamin) deficiency. The purpose of the test was to determine how well a patient is able to absorb B12 from their intestinal tract.  The test is now considered obsolete and is rarely performed, and is no longer available at many medical centers.  It is named for Robert F. Schilling.

Process
The Schilling test has multiple stages. As noted below, it can be done at any time after vitamin B supplementation and body store replacement, and some clinicians recommend that in severe deficiency cases, at least several weeks of vitamin repletion be done before the test (more than one B shot, and also oral folic acid), in order to ensure that impaired absorption of B (with or without intrinsic factor) is not occurring due to damage to the intestinal mucosa from the B and folate deficiency themselves.

Stage 1: oral vitamin B plus intramuscular vitamin B12 (without IF) 
In the first part of the test, the patient is given radiolabeled vitamin B to drink or eat. The most commonly used radiolabels are 57Co and 58Co. An intramuscular injection of unlabeled vitamin B is given an hour later. This is not enough to replete or saturate body stores of B. The purpose of the single injection is to temporarily saturate B receptors in the liver with enough normal vitamin B to prevent radioactive vitamin B binding in body tissues (especially in the liver), so that if absorbed from the G.I. tract, it will pass into the urine. The patient's urine is then collected over the next 24 hours to assess the absorption.

Normally, the ingested radiolabeled vitamin B will be absorbed into the body. Since the body already has liver receptors for transcobalamin/vitamin B saturated by the injection, much of the ingested vitamin B will be excreted in the urine.

 A normal result shows at least 10% of the radiolabeled vitamin B in the urine over the first 24 hours.
 In patients with pernicious anemia or with deficiency due to impaired absorption, less than 10% of the radiolabeled vitamin B is detected.

The normal test will result in a higher amount of the radiolabeled cobalamin in the urine because it would have been absorbed by the intestinal epithelium, but passed into the urine because all hepatic B12 receptors were occupied. An abnormal result is caused by less of the labeled cobalamin to appear in the urine because it will remain in the intestine and be passed into the feces.

Stage 2: vitamin B and intrinsic factor 
If an abnormality is found, i.e. the B12 in the urine is only present in low levels, the test is repeated, this time with additional oral intrinsic factor.

 If this second urine collection is normal, this shows a lack of intrinsic factor production. This is by definition pernicious anemia.
 A low result on the second test implies abnormal intestinal absorption (malabsorption), which could be caused by coeliac disease, biliary disease, Whipple's disease, small bowel bacterial overgrowth syndrome, fish tapeworm infestation (Diphyllobothrium latum), or liver disease. Malabsorption of B can be caused by intestinal dysfunction from a low vitamin level in-and-of-itself (see below), causing test result confusion if repletion has not been done for some days previously.

Stage 3: vitamin B and antibiotics 
This stage is useful for identifying patients with bacterial overgrowth syndrome. The physician will provide a course of 2 weeks of antibiotics to eliminate any possible bacterial overgrowth and repeat the test to check whether radio-labeled Vitamin B12 would be found in urine or not.

Stage 4: vitamin B and pancreatic enzymes 
This stage, in which pancreatic enzymes are administered, can be useful in identifying patients with pancreatic insufficiency. The physician will give 3 days of pancreatic enzymes followed by repeating the test to check if radio-labeled Vitamin B12 would be detected in urine.

Combined stage 1 and stage 2
In some versions of the Schilling test, B can be given both with and without intrinsic factor at the same time, using different cobalt radioisotopes 57Co and 58Co, which have different radiation signatures, in order to differentiate the two forms of B. This is performed with the 'Dicopac' kitset. This allows for only a single radioactive urine collection.

Complications
Note that the B shot which begins the Schilling test is enough to go a considerable way toward treating B deficiency, so the test is also a partial treatment for B deficiency. Also, the classic Schilling test can be performed at any time, even after full B repletion and correction of the anemia, and it will still show if the cause of the B deficiency was intrinsic-factor related. In fact, some clinicians have suggested that folate and B replacement for several weeks be normally performed before a Schilling test is done, since folate and B deficiencies are both known to interfere with intestinal cell function, and thus cause malabsorption of B on their own, even if intrinsic factor is being made. This state would then tend to cause a false-positive test for both simple B and intrinsic factor-related B malabsorption. Several weeks of vitamin replacement are necessary, before epithelial damage to the G.I. tract from B deficiency is corrected.

Many labs have stopped performing the Schilling test, due to lack of production of the cobalt radioisotopes and labeled-B test substances. Also, injection replacement of B has become relatively inexpensive, and can be self-administered by patients, as well as megadose oral B. Since these are the same treatments which would be administered for most causes of B malabsorption even if the exact cause were identified, the diagnostic test may be omitted without damage to the patient (so long as follow-up treatment and occasional serum B testing is not allowed to lapse).

It is possible for use of other radiopharmaceuticals to interfere with interpretation of the test.

Diagnoses

References

External links
 

Chemical pathology